Alaska v. Native Village of Venetie Tribal Government, 522 U.S. 520 (1998), was a United States Supreme Court case. The local tribal council in Venetie, Alaska, wanted to collect tax from non-tribal members doing business on tribal lands. The Supreme Court granted certiorari on appeal from the United States Court of Appeals for the Ninth Circuit, which had ruled in the tribe's favor, saying they occupied Indian Country.

The Court decided unanimously that the land was not the tribe's land subject to the tribal tax, even though it was owned by the tribe, because it was not part of a Native American reservation. Because all but one reservation in Alaska (the Annette Island reservation of the Tsimshian) had been eliminated by the Alaska Native Claims Settlement Act of 1971, the decision had the practical effect of prohibiting almost all Indian tribes in Alaska from collecting taxes for activities conducted on tribal land. Taxing authority is reserved as a right of the states and federal government.

The State of Alaska, the petitioner, was represented by John G. Roberts, who later became the Chief Justice of the United States. The respondent was represented by Heather Kendall-Miller, an attorney of Athabascan descent.

External links
 

1996 in Alaska
1997 in Alaska
1998 in Alaska
1998 in United States case law
Alaska Natives and United States law
United States Native American case law
United States Native American tax case law
United States Supreme Court cases
United States Supreme Court cases of the Rehnquist Court
Yukon–Koyukuk Census Area, Alaska